Werner Hacke, born 1948 in Duisburg, Germany, was Professor and Chairman of the Department of Neurology, University of Heidelberg, from 1987 to 2014 and holds now a Senior Professorship of Neurology at the University of Heidelberg, Germany.

Graduation 
He graduated from the Klinikum Aachen Medical School  of the RWTH Aachen and holds also a Master's degree in Psychology.

He is a board certified neurologist, psychiatrist, and neurocritical care specialist. He received his neurology training at the RWTH Aachen medical school, Germany, and  Berne, Switzerland. After spending almost one year of research at the Scripps Clinic and Research Foundation in La Jolla, California, he was elected to the chair position of Neurology at the University of Heidelberg, at that time being the youngest chairman of Neurology ever elected in Germany. In 2014, after 27 years as chair and head of the department he stepped down from his clinical duties and is now the first Senior Professor of Medicine at the University of Heidelberg, Germany.

Research 
Hacke is involved with many clinical studies, both industry-supported and investigator-driven. Recently he led studies including ECASS I-IV AbESTT I and II, DIAS I and II, CHARISMA, DESTINY, DESTINY II and SPACE 1 and 2, only to name a few, as chair or co-chair of the steering committee.

Awards and honors 
Hacke was the recipient of the Yamanouchi Europe research award, the first non-US recipient of the Feinberg Award for excellence in stroke research, given by the American Stroke Association (1998), and the first recipient of the Karolinska Stroke Award, Stockholm, Sweden in 2004, Recipient of the Mihara Award 2009 (Tokyo, Japan) and the Max Jarecki Award (New York, USA) in 2009. In 2013 he was awarded the Wepfer Award by the European stroke conference. In 2018 he received the ESO science award. In 2020 he received the WSO Leadership in Stroke Award.

He is an honorary member of the Austrian and the Hungarian Stroke Society, the  French Neurological Society, Pan-Russian Neurological Association, the  American Neurological Association (ANA, Honorary Fellow), The Brasilian Neurological Society and is an honorary president of the Neurocritical Care Society (NCS).

Hacke has been named an honorary member of the German Neurological Society, the German Stroke Society, the German Society of Neuroradiology, and the German Society of Neurosurgery, being the first Neurologist to receive this honor for more than 100 years.

Hacke holds an honorary doctor degree given by the State University of Georgia, Tbilisi, and an honorary doctor degree by the University of Debrecen, Hungary. Hacke holds honorary professorships by the University of Tbilisi, Georgia and the Universidad de Los Andes, Santiago de Chile, Chile.

Publications 
He was on the editorial board of many international journals, European editor of "Stroke" and author of more than 800 peer-reviewed papers in high impact journals.  He is the Editor in Chief of the German language specialty journal "Der Nervenarzt" and the Founding Editor in Chief of a new English Language Journal "Neurological Research and Practice", an official open-access journal published by BMC and the German Society of Neurology. He is co-author of the leading German-language textbook of neurology (Neurologie), together with his teacher Prof Klaus Poeck, and several other books on stroke, intensive care, and general neurology. In 2015 he edited the 14th edition of this leading German Neurology Textbook.

Hacke has published more than 500 articles listed in PubMed and Google Scholar citations. His h-index is 140 Google Scholar citations and his number of citations are over 120,000 Google Scholar citations.  He is a top-ranked author for publications in stroke and stroke therapy both by number and by citations in the last decade.Clavariate; Web of Science. He his on the list of "highly cited researchers" for several years.Clavariate; Web of Science .

Personal life 
Hacke is married to Monika Hacke, and they have two daughters and five grandchildren

References

1948 births
German neurologists
Academic staff of Heidelberg University
Living people
Scripps Research
Recipients of the Order of Merit of Baden-Württemberg
RWTH Aachen University alumni